Manspace may refer to: 

 Man cave
 ManSpace (TV series)
 ManSpace, a consumer magazine published by Connection Magazines